"Walk" and "Spin" are songs by American rapper Kodak Black, released together on September 16, 2022, as a dual single and the lead single from his mixtape Kutthroat Bill: Vol. 1 (2022). Both songs were produced by Tye Beats, while "Spin" was also produced by 8th.

Composition
With "Walk", Kodak Black raps about women, wealth and street life, while "Spin" has an atmosphere intended for dancing.

Reception
The songs received praise from fans for a "unique flow and cadence".

Music video
The music video for "Walk" was directed by KillerJack and released alongside the single. In it, Kodak Black is seen on a bike in the company of three women and sitting on steps leading to nowhere in a dark environment. The music video for "Spin" shows him making dance moves in a Soul Train-inspired setting.

Controversy
In October 2022, American rapper Saucy Santana accused Kodak Black of copying his song "Walk", released in June 2021, on "Spin"; the word walk is repeatedly used in the choruses of both songs.

Charts

"Walk"

"Spin"

References

2022 singles
2022 songs
Kodak Black songs
Songs written by Kodak Black
Atlantic Records singles